Stanley County was an electoral district for the Legislative Assembly in the Colony of New South Wales created in 1856 election, named after and including County of Stanley (part of Queensland after 1859), except for the towns of North Brisbane, South Brisbane, Kangaroo Point and Ipswich, which were in Stanley Boroughs. It was abolished in 1859 and replaced with East Moreton and West Moreton.

Members for Stanley County

Election results

1856

1858

References

Stanley County
1856 establishments in Australia
1859 disestablishments in Australia
Stanley County
History of Queensland